

Presidents

General secretaries
A list of General Secretaries of the Ulster Unionist Council. From 1998 until 2007, the post was "Chief Executive of the Ulster Unionist Party".

1905: T. H. Gibson
1906: Dawson Bates
1921: Wilson Hungerford
1941: Billy Douglas
1963: Jim Bailie
1974: Norman Hutton
1983: Frank Millar Jr
1987: Jim Wilson
1998: David Boyd
2003: Alastair Patterson
2004: Lyle Rea
2005: Will Corry
2007: Jim Wilson
2010: Colin McCusker
2019: Alexander Redpath

See also
 Ulster Unionist Party
 Leaders of the Ulster Unionist Party

References

Ulster Unionist Party